Tagbanwa is one of the scripts indigenous to the Philippines, used by the Tagbanwa and the Palawan people as their ethnic writing system.

The Tagbanwa languages (Aborlan, Calamian and Central), which are Austronesian languages with about 25,000 total speakers in the central and northern regions of Palawan, are dying out as the younger generations of Tagbanwa are learning and using non-traditional languages such as Cuyonon and Tagalog, thus becoming less knowledgeable of their own indigenous cultural heritage. There are proposals to revive the script by teaching it in public and private schools with Tagbanwa populations.

Origin
The Tagbanwa script was used in the Philippines until the 17th century. Closely related to Baybayin, it is believed to have come from the Kawi script of Java, Bali and Sumatra, which in turn, descended from the Pallava script, one of the southern Indian scripts derived from Brahmi.

Features
Tagbanwa is a syllabic alphabet in which each consonant has an inherent vowel /a/. Other vowels are indicated by a diacritic above (for /i/) or below (for /u/) the consonant. Vowels at the beginning of syllables are represented by their own, independent characters. Syllables ending in a consonant are written without the final consonant. Tagbanwa is distinguished from Baybayin by shapes for several letters, most notably ‹k› and ‹w› that are markedly different from other Baybayin varieties.

Tagbanwa is traditionally written on bamboo in vertical columns from bottom to top and left to right, though it is read from left to right in horizontal lines.

Vowels

Consonants

Tagbanwa writing makes use of single and double punctuation marks.

Ibalnan

In the 20th century, this script was adopted from the Tagbanwa by the Palawan people further south in the island. They call this alphabet Ibalnan and the vowel mark an ulit.

Unicode

Tagbanwa script was added to the Unicode Standard in March, 2002 with the release of version 3.2.

The Unicode block for Tagbanwa is U+1760–U+177F:

See also
Suyat
Baybayin
Buhid script
Hanunó'o script
Kulitan 
Kawi script
Filipino orthography

References

External links
Tagbanwa font

Philippine scripts
Brahmic scripts
Tagbanwa